Dilek Öcalan (born 3 October 1987) is a Kurdish politician of the Peoples' Democratic Party (HDP) who served as a Member of Parliament for the electoral district of Şanlıurfa, Turkey, from 2015 to 2018. She is the niece of Abdullah Öcalan, the imprisoned leader of the Kurdistan Workers' Party (PKK) militant organisation that has been in conflict with the Turkish Armed Forces since the 1980s, making both her candidacy and election to the Grand National Assembly controversial.

Early life
Öcalan was born on 3 October 1987 in Halfeti, Sanlıurfa, as daughter of Fatma Öcalan, the sister of imprisoned PKK leader Abdullah Öcalan. She has a tourism degree from university. On 23 December 2013, she visited her uncle at İmralı prison and became known to the media after she gave a press statement detailing the conversation between them. Öcalan has been imprisoned since 1999, serving a sentence of aggravated life imprisonment under charges of founding and leading a terrorist organization (namely the PKK, which is recognized as a terrorist organisation by Turkey, the European Union and the United States).

Political career
Öcalan first entered politics in 2012, a year before meeting her uncle on the Island of İmralı. During the third congress of the pro-Kurdish Peace and Democracy Party (BDP), she was elected to the party executive while the party changed its name to Democratic Regions Party (DBP) and adopted a fraternal relationship with the Peoples' Democratic Party (HDP).

Member of Parliament
Öcalan's candidacy to become a Member of Parliament despite being the niece of Abdullah Öcalan was heavily controversial, drawing strong opposition from Turkish nationalists. Her candidacy also allegedly caused a split within the Öcalan family. Nevertheless, she was put forward as a HDP candidate for the electoral district of Şanlıurfa, being fielded as the second candidate on the HDP's provincial party list. She was subsequently elected in the June 2015 general election to become one of the youngest MPs in the new Parliament, resulting in her being appointed to the temporary Speaker's Council until a new Council could be elected in July. In the snap elections in November 2015 Öcalan was reelected as an MP.

Prosecution 
After on 1 February 2017 and arrest warrant was issued for Öcalan she was detained on 7 February and released to the same day. After she left Turkey and went into exile. On 1 March 2018 she was sentenced to two years and six months in prison for spreading terror propaganda during a speech she held at a funeral.

See also
 Kurdish nationalism

References

External links
 MP profile on the Grand National Assembly website
 Collection of all relevant news items at Haberler.com

Living people
1987 births
Peoples' Democratic Party (Turkey) politicians
Democratic Regions Party politicians
People from Şanlıurfa
Deputies of Şanlıurfa
Members of the 26th Parliament of Turkey
Members of the 25th Parliament of Turkey
Turkish Kurdish politicians
Kurdish politicians
Turkish Kurdish women
21st-century Kurdish women politicians
21st-century Turkish women politicians
Öcalan family